This is a list of mayors of Eygelshoven, a former municipality in the southeast Netherlands. 

In 1982 the municipality of Eygelshoven merged into Kerkrade.

Mayors of Eygelshoven 
1857 - 1881 W.D. Wimmers
1881 - 1886 F.M.H. Valckenberg
1886 - 1919 L. Dohmen
1919 - 1928 Willem M. Loyson
1928 - 1934 J.H. Martin
1934 - 1969 H.J. Boijens
1969 - 1975 J.G.A. Janssen
1975 - 1982 J.H.C. Persoon

See also 
 List of mayors of Kerkrade

External links 
List of mayors of Kerkrade and Eygelshoven at www.kgv.nl

 Eygelshoven
Eygelshoven